The following is a list of events relating to television in Ireland from 1988.

Events

30 April – Ireland hosts the Eurovision Song Contest from the RDS Simmonscourt Pavilion, Dublin, after winning it the previous year. Pat Kenny and Michelle Rocca host the 33rd annual contest, which is won by Switzerland with the song Ne Partez Pas Sans Moi (Don't Leave Without Me), sung by a 20-year-old Celine Dion.
3 July – The Broadcasting and Wireless Telegraphy Act, legislation concerning licensing for broadcasting, comes into law.
September – RTÉ 2 is rebranded as Network 2 as part of a major overhaul of the channel.
3 October – Australian soap Home and Away receives its Irish television debut on Network 2.

Debuts

RTÉ 1
4 March – / A Little Princess (1986)
7 April –  Fireman Sam (1987–present)
15 April –  The Gemini Factor (1987)
10 June –  The Secret World of Polly Flint (1987)
11 June – / Ovide Video (1987–1988)
5 July –  Chocky's Challenge (1986)
13 July –  Kaboodle (1987–1990)
6 August –  The Raccoons (1985–1991)
15 October – Kenny Live (1988–1999)
Undated –  DuckTales (1987–1990)
Bibi (1988-1994)

Network 2
1 May –  Jim Henson Presents the World of Puppetry (1985)
September – Jo Maxi (1988–1993)
3 October –  Home and Away (1988–present)
6 October – / The Care Bears Family (1986–1988)
6 October – /// Once Upon a Time... Life (1987)
6 October – The Floradora Folk (1988–1989)
11 October – Nighthawks (1988–1992)
28 October –  T-Bag (1985–1992)
1 December – / The Mysterious Cities of Gold (1982–1983)
Undated –  The Tracey Ullman Show (1987–1990)
Undated –  The Storyteller (1987–1988)
Undated -  Full House (1987-1995)

Changes of network affiliation

Ongoing television programmes

1960s
RTÉ News: Nine O'Clock (1961–present)
RTÉ News: Six One (1962–present)
The Late Late Show (1962–present)

1970s
Sports Stadium (1973–1997)
The Late Late Toy Show (1975–present)
RTÉ News on Two (1978–2014)
Bosco (1979–1996)
The Sunday Game (1979–present)

1980s
Today Tonight (1982–1992)
Mailbag (1982–1996)
Glenroe (1983–2001)
Rapid Roulette (1986–1990)
Live at 3 (1986–1997)
Saturday Live (1986–1999)
Questions and Answers (1986–2009)
Dempsey's Den (1986–2010)
Marketplace (1987–1996)
Where in the World? (1987–1996)
Know Your Sport (1987–1998)

See also
1988 in Ireland

References

 
1980s in Irish television